The Roman Catholic Diocese of Xuân Lộc is a suffragan Latin diocese in the ecclesiastical province of the Archdiocese of Ho Chi Minh city in southern Vietnam, yet depends on the missionary Roman Congregation for the Evangelization of Peoples.
 
Its cathedral episcopal see is Cathedral of Christ the King (Nhà thờ Chính toà Chúa Giêsu Vua), dedicated to Christ the King, in Long Khánh, Đồng Nai, Southeastern Vietnam. The bishop, since January 16, 2021, is John Đỗ Văn Ngân.

History 
 It was erected on 14 October 1965, as Diocese of Xuân Lôc / Xuân Lộc (Tiếng Việt) / 春祿 (正體中文) / Xuanlocen(sis) (Latin), on territory split off from its Metropolitan, the Archdiocese of Saigon (now Ho Chi Minh city)
 On 22 November 2005, it lost part of its territory to establish the Diocese of Ba Ria.

Statistics 
As of 2014, the diocese pastorally served 921,489 Catholics (30.5% of 3,020,800 total) on 5,964 km² in 246 parishes with 498 priests (359 diocesan, 139 religious), 2,256 lay religious (447 brothers, 1,809 sisters) and 168 seminarians.

Episcopal ordinaries
(all Roman Rite)

Suffragan Bishops of Xuân Lôc 
 Joseph Lê Văn Ấn (14 October 1965 - death 17 June 1974)
 Dominique Nguyên Văn Lãng (1 July 1974 - death 22 February 1988) 
 Paul Marie Nguyễn Minh Nhật (22 February 1988 - retired 30 September 2004), President of Episcopal Conference of Vietnam (1990 – 1995), died 2007; previously Titular Bishop of Vergi (1975.07.16 – 1988.02.22) as Coadjutor Bishop of Xuân Lôc (1975.07.16 – succession 1988.02.22)
 Auxiliary Bishop: Thomas Nguyễn Văn Trâm (1992.03.06 – 2005.11.22), Titular Bishop of Hilta (1992.03.06 – 2005.11.22); later first Bishop of Ba Ria (Vietnam) (2005.11.22 – ...)
 Dominique Nguyễn Chu Trinh (30 September 2004 - retired 7 May 2016)
 Auxiliary Bishop: Thomas Vũ Đình Hiệu (2009.07.25 – 2012.12.24), Titular Bishop of Bahanna (2009.07.25 – 2012.12.24); later Coadjutor Bishop of Bùi Chu (Vietnam) (2012.12.24 – 2013.08.17), succeeding as Bishop of Bùi Chu (Vietnam) (2013.08.17 – ...)
 Joseph Đinh Đức Đạo (7 May 2016 - 2021.01.16), previously Titular Bishop of Gadiaufala (2013.02.28 – 2015.06.04) as Auxiliary Bishop of Xuân Lôc (2013.02.28 – 2015.06.04), Coadjutor Bishop of Xuân Lôc (2015.06.04 – 2016.05.07)
 Auxiliary Bishop (2017.05.02 – 2021.01.16): John Đỗ Văn Ngân, Titular Bishop of Buleliana (2017.05.02 – 2021.01.16).
 John Đỗ Văn Ngân. Bishop of Xuân Lộc (2021.01.16 - ...)

See also 
 List of Catholic dioceses in Vietnam

References

Sources and external links 
 GCatholic - data for all sections
 catholic-hierarchy.org

Roman Catholic dioceses in Vietnam
Religious organizations established in 1965
Roman Catholic dioceses and prelatures established in the 20th century
Roman Catholic Ecclesiastical Province of Ho Chi Minh City